USS Pentheus (ARL-20) was one of 39 Achelous-class landing craft repair ships built for the United States Navy during World War II. Named for Pentheus (a king of Thebes, according to Greek legend), she was the only U.S. Naval vessel to bear the name.

Originally laid down as LST–1115 by the Chicago Bridge and Iron Company of Seneca, Illinois on 29 September 1944; launched 22 December 1944; and placed in reduced commission 4 January 1945. Proceeding to Baltimore, Maryland, she decommissioned 6 February 1945; underwent conversion; and was commissioned in full as USS Pentheus (ARL–20) 7 June 1945.

Service history
Following shakedown in Chesapeake Bay, Pentheus took on pontoons at Providence, Rhode Island, and on 15 July got underway for the Canal Zone. Crossing into the Pacific 26 July, she steamed on to Subic Bay, Philippines. Arriving 17 October, she engaged in repair work there until sailing for Pearl Harbor 5 January 1946. From Pearl Harbor, she steamed to Johnston Island for two weeks duty prior to getting underway for Green Cove Springs, Florida and inactivation.

Arriving 20 April she decommissioned and joined the Atlantic Reserve Fleet, where she remained until struck from the Naval Vessel Register 1 January 1960. She was sold on 13 June 1960 to Ships, Inc. of Florida. Her final fate is unknown.

References
 
 

Achelous-class repair ships
Achelous-class repair ships converted from LST-542-class ships
World War II auxiliary ships of the United States
Ships built in Seneca, Illinois
1944 ships